The Tumey Hills are a low mountain range in the interior California Coast Ranges, in western Fresno County, California.  The Tumey Hills area is part of the U.S. Bureau of Land Management (BLM), which is a division of the United States Department of the Interior.  This BLM land is under Fire Season Vehicle Restrictions from mid-April to mid-October. No motorized access is allowed during this time period.

Flora
Tumey Hills BLM offers a mixture of native and non-native species.  Non-native plants include:
 Wild Oats (Avena spp.)
 Filaree (Erodium spp.)
 Barnyard Foxtail (Hordeum murinum)
 Bromus spp.
 Rat-tail Fescue (Vulpia myuros)
Native plants of Tumey Hills include:
 Forked Fiddleneck (Amsinckia furcata)
 Miner's lettuce (Claytonia perfoliata)

References 

California Coast Ranges
Mountain ranges of Fresno County, California
Hills of California
Mountain ranges of Northern California